Emancipation of Labour was the first Russian Marxist group. It was founded in exile by Georgi Plekhanov, Vasily Ignatov, Vera Zasulich, Leo Deutsch, and Pavel Axelrod, at Geneva (Switzerland) in 1883. Deutsch left the group in 1884 when he was arrested and sent to Siberia and Sergei Ingerman joined in 1888. The group published the first Russian language translations of many works by Karl Marx and distributed them. It became the major adversary to the Narodniks on the left wing of politics in the Russian Empire. 

Two drafts (1883 and 1885) of a program for the Russian Social Democrats, written by Plekhanov, were also published by the group, marking an important step to what would become the building of the Russian Social Democratic Labour Party (RSDLP). At the first congress of the Second International in Paris (1889) onwards, the group represented the RSDLP. 

Within Russia itself, Emancipation of Labour influenced a separate group, the League of Struggle for the Emancipation of the Working Class (Союз борьбы за освобождение рабочего класса), formed by Vladimir Lenin and others at Saint Petersburg in 1895. Lenin later wrote that Emancipation of Labour "laid the theoretical foundations for the Social-Democratic movement and took the first step towards the working-class movement in Russia."

Emancipation of Labour announced its dissolution during the Second Congress of the RSDLP, in August 1903.

References
Marxists.org Glossary of Organisations
Programme of the Social-Democratic Emancipation of Labour Group

1883 establishments in the Russian Empire
1903 establishments in the Russian Empire
Defunct organizations based in Russia
Labour parties
Marxism
Organizations established in 1883
Organizations disestablished in 1903
Political parties in the Russian Empire
Russian Social Democratic Labour Party
Socialist organizations in Russia